Avondale is a neighborhood in Cincinnati, Ohio. It is home to the Cincinnati Zoo and Botanical Garden. The population was 11,345 at the 2020 census.

92 percent of Avondale residents are African American and more than 40 percent are living at or below the poverty level. More than 77 percent rent housing. Two race riots began in Avondale in 1967 and 1968, which were part of the larger Civil Rights Movement and Black Power movement in the United States. The neighborhood is bordered by North Avondale, Evanston, Walnut Hills, Corryville, and Clifton.

Demographics

Source - City of Cincinnati Statistical Database
Note North Avondale and Paddock Hills are within the same Census Tract from 1900-1970. North Avondale was officially designated a neighborhood in the 1970s. Population after 1970 was split from Avondale.

History
During the 19th century Avondale was a rural suburb. Its settlers were mostly Protestant families from England or Germany. It is claimed that the wife of Stephen Burton, a wealthy ironworks owner, began calling the area Avondale in 1853 after she saw a resemblance between the stream behind her house and the Avon River in England. It was incorporated July 27, 1864, by Daniel Collier, Seth Evans and Joe C. Moores.

Between the 1870s and 1890s, the community was plagued by burglaries, vagrants, public drunkenness, and brawling. Avondale was annexed by the City of Cincinnati in 1896. After streetcar lines were laid less affluent residents settled in the neighborhood; from 1920 until after World War II, 60% of Avondale was Jewish. It remained a closed neighborhood until the construction of the Millcreek Expressway in the 1940s, which displaced residents from the Black West End neighborhood. At that time realtors only permitted Black families to move into neighborhoods which already had a Black population, and Avondale had had Black residents since the mid-nineteenth century.

After Black families began relocating to Avondale, it split into two increasingly distinct and separate North and South neighborhoods. The residents of North Avondale were able to maintain the value of their property and the character of their streets. The rest of Avondale became known for its rising crime rate, falling land values, and deteriorating housing. Absentee landlords neglected their properties and tenants often abused the buildings. By 1956, the city identified Avondale as blighted and tried to rehabilitate it, with the work from 1965 and 1975 benefitting institutions such as the University of Cincinnati and nearby hospitals. The city promised to improve the housing situation, but broke that promise by instead enacting widespread demolition for street improvements, parking, and institutional expansion, which reduced the amount of available housing.

Riots of 1967

The 1967 Riots began on June 12 and lasted several days. They were just one of 159 riots that swept cities in the United States during the "Long Hot Summer of 1967". In May 1967 Posteal Laskey Jr. was convicted as the Cincinnati Strangler. Laskey was a man accused of allegedly raping and murdering six women, and the jury's decision was considered controversial. On June 11 Peter Frakes, Laskey's cousin, picketed with a sign that read, "Cincinnati Guilty-Laskey Innocent!" Frakes was arrested by police for exercising his First Amendment rights. Incensed Black community leaders held a protest meeting on June 12 at the Abraham Lincoln statue on the corner of Reading and Rockdale Roads. Some people broke away from the riot in order to damage property.

In Avondale some of the rioters smashed, looted, damaged cars, buildings, and stores. A witness reported, "there's not a window left on Reading Road or Burnett Avenue. The youths are doing it and adults are standing by and laughing. All ages are active. Women could be seen carrying babies." The rioting spread from Avondale to Bond Hill, Winton Terrace, Walnut Hills, Corryville, Clifton, West End, and Downtown. A 15-year-old boy was critically wounded in front of a fire station that was being fired upon by a car full of rioters. According to an Avondale resident, rioting was over the constant police harassment, lack of jobs, and shopkeepers "jacking up prices and selling bad products."

Governor James A. Rhodes ordered 700 Ohio National Guardsmen into Cincinnati to halt the rioters. The National Guard patrolled the streets in jeeps, armed with machine guns. Rioters avoided these armed forces as the Guardsmen were given the order to kill if they were fired upon. By June 15, when the riot had been stopped, one person was dead, 63 injured, 404 had been arrested, and the city had incurred $2 million in property damage.

The day before the riots began Martin Luther King Jr. visited Zion Baptist Church in Avondale and preached a doctrine of non-violence.

Riots of 1968
Less than a year later the neighborhood erupted into unrest again. The 1968 riots were in response to the assassination of Martin Luther King Jr. on April 4, 1968. Tension in Avondale had already been high due to a lack of job opportunities for Black men, and the assassination escalated that tension. On April 8, around 1,500 Black community members attended a memorial held at a local recreation center.

An officer of the Congress of Racial Equality blamed white people for King's death and urged the crowd to retaliate. The crowd was orderly when it left the memorial and spilled out into the street. Nearby James Smith, a Black man, attempted to protect a jewelry store while under attack. During the struggle with the attackers, Smith accidentally shot and killed his wife with his own shotgun.

Rioting started after a rumor spread in the crowd that Smith's wife was killed by a police officer. Rioters smashed store windows and looted merchandise. More than 70 fires had been set, several of them major. Eight youths dragged a student, Noel Wright, and his wife from their car in Mount Auburn. Wright was stabbed to death and his wife was beaten.

The next night, the city was put under curfew, and nearly 1,500 National Guardsmen were brought in to subdue the protest. Several days after the riot started, two people were dead, hundreds were arrested, and the city had incurred $3 million in property damage.

Aftermath of Riots
Avondale's formerly flourishing business district along Burnet Avenue was vacated following the riots of 1967 and 1968. Many of the damaged areas were left vacant for a decade. The riots helped fuel beliefs that the city was too dangerous for families and helped accelerate "white flight" to the suburbs. 

Between 1960 and 1970 the city of Cincinnati lost 10% of its population, compared to a loss of just 0.3% from 1950 to 1960.

After the riots, Black community members were appointed to city boards and commissions. In 1967, none of the 69 board members were Black.

Recreation
The  Fleischmann Gardens park was established in 1925 on land donated by the heirs of prominent Avondale resident Charles Louis Fleischmann.

Education
Avondale is served by a branch of the Public Library of Cincinnati and Hamilton County.

South Avondale Elementary serves kindergarten through 6th grade, and is part of the Cincinnati Public Schools system. Phoenix Community Learning center is a public charter school also located in Avondale, serving kindergarten through 10th grade.

Avondale is adjacent to Xavier University and Cincinnati Children's Hospital, and in close proximity to the University of Cincinnati and its medical centers.

Notable people
 John Kenneth Blackwell
 Don Brodie
 Elizabeth Drew
 Ban Johnson
 David Justice
 Charles Keating
 James Levine
 Una Merkel
 Curtis Peagler
 Tuffy Rhodes
 Jerry Rubin
 Evelyn Venable

See also
List of incidents of civil unrest in the United States

Notes
 Rucker, Walter C. and James N. Upton (2007), Encyclopedia of American race riots, Greenwood Publishing Group. 
 Stradling, David (2003), Cincinnati: From River City to Highway Metropolis, Arcade Publishing.

References

External links
 Avondale Community Council

1967 in Ohio
1967 riots
1968 in Ohio
1968 riots
King assassination riots
Neighborhoods in Cincinnati
African-American history in Cincinnati
Riots and civil disorder in Cincinnati
African-American riots in the United States
Former municipalities in Ohio